Mark Botell (born August 27, 1961) is a Canadian retired professional ice hockey player. 

Botell was born in Scarborough, Ontario. As a youth, he played in the 1974 Quebec International Pee-Wee Hockey Tournament with a minor ice hockey team from Wexford, Toronto. He played in 32 National Hockey League (NHL) games with the Philadelphia Flyers during the 1981–82 season.

Career statistics

References

External links
 

1961 births
Living people
's-Hertogenbosch Red Eagles players
Brantford Alexanders players
Canadian expatriate ice hockey players in the Netherlands
Canadian ice hockey defencemen
Maine Mariners players
Montana Magic players
Niagara Falls Flyers players
Oshawa Generals players
Peoria Rivermen (IHL) players
Philadelphia Flyers draft picks
Philadelphia Flyers players
Sportspeople from Scarborough, Toronto
Ice hockey people from Toronto
St. Catharines Saints players
Toledo Goaldiggers players
Windsor Spitfires players